was a short-lived province in Hokkaidō.  It corresponded to Shiribeshi Subprefecture minus Abuta District plus the northern part of Hiyama Subprefecture.

History
After 1869, the northern Japanese island was known as Hokkaido; and regional administrative subdivisions were identified, including Shiribeshi Province.
 
At the same time, the Shiribeshi Province continued to exist for some purposes. For example, Shiribeshi is explicitly recognized in treaties in 1894 (a) between Japan and the United States and (b) between Japan and the United Kingdom.

Timeline
659—the area named "Shiribeshi" first appears in Japanese historical records. The Nihon Shoki records that Abe no Hirafu (fl. 7th century) was dispatched by the imperial government in Kyoto to subdue the aboriginal inhabitants of the area, referred to as emishi.
1869—use of the Hokkaido name started
August 15, 1869—Shiribeshi Province established with 17 districts
1872—Census finds 19,098 inhabitants of Shiribeshi Province
 1882—prefectures established
 1886—Hokkaido Agency established
 1947—Hokkaido Prefecture established

Districts
Kudō (久遠郡)
Okushiri (奥尻郡)
Futoru (太櫓郡) Dissolved April 1, 1955 when Futoru Village merged with Tōsetana Town from Setana District to form Kitahiyama Town
Setana (瀬棚郡)
Shimamake (島牧郡)
Suttsu (寿都郡)
Utasutsu (歌棄郡) Dissolve January 15, 1955 when Utasutsu Village was incorporated into Suttsu Town, Suttsu District, Neppu Village merged with Suttsu District's Kuromatsunai Village and part of Tarukishi Village to form Sanwa Village (now Kuromatsunai Town)
Isoya (磯屋郡, later respelled 磯谷郡)
Iwanai (岩内郡)
Furuu (古宇郡)
Shakotan (積丹郡)
Bikuni (美国郡) Dissolved September 30, 1956 when Bikuni Town was incorporated into Shakotan Town, Shakotan District.
Furubira (古平郡)
Yoichi (余市郡)
Oshoro (忍路郡) Dissolved April 1, 1958 when Shioya? Village was incorporated into Otaru City
Takashima (高島郡) Dissolved September 1, 1940 when Takashima Town was incorporated into Otaru
Otaru (小樽郡) Dissolved September 1, 1940 when Asato? Village was incorporated into Otaru

Notes

References
 Nussbaum, Louis-Frédéric and Käthe Roth. (2005).  Japan encyclopedia. Cambridge: Harvard University Press. ;  OCLC 58053128
 Papinot, Edmond. (1910). Historical and Geographic Dictionary of Japan. Tokyo: Librarie Sansaisha. OCLC 77691250

Former provinces of Japan